Puiu is both a Romanian masculine given name and a surname. Notable people with the name include:

Cristi Puiu (born 1967), Romanian film director and screenwriter
Visarion Puiu (1879–1964), Romanian Orthodox bishop
Puiu Dumitrescu, private secretary to King Carol II
Puiu Hașotti (born 1953), Romanian politician
Puiu Manu (born 1928), Romanian graphic designer and comic book creator

See also 
 Puiești (disambiguation)

Romanian masculine given names
Romanian-language surnames